Mariapanteles is a genus of braconid wasps in the family Braconidae. There are at least two described species in Mariapanteles.

Species
These two species belong to the genus Mariapanteles:
 Mariapanteles dapkeyae Fernández-Triana, 2012 (Brazil)
 Mariapanteles felipei Whitfield, 2012 (Costa Rica)

References

Microgastrinae